Scopula prosthiostigma is a moth of the  family Geometridae. It is found in India (Sikkim).

References

Moths described in 1938
prosthiostigma
Moths of Asia